The Chapel of San Lorenzo Ruiz was a  Roman Catholic chapel in the Roman Catholic Archdiocese of New York, located at 378 Broome Street between Mulberry and Mott Streets in the Nolita neighborhood of Manhattan, New York City. The chapel was established in 2005. The building was originally constructed for the Church of the Most Holy Crucifix in 1925–26, and was designed by Robert J. Reiley.

The chapel is designated for the Filipino Apostolate of the Archdiocese.  It was named as the official "Church of Filipinos" by Archbishop Edward Cardinal Egan on June 15, 2005.

Building
The Church of the Most Holy Crucifix parish was established in 1925 for the mostly Italian community. It closed in 2005, when the building became the Chapel of San Lorenzo Ruiz. The sanctuary, along with a three-story rectory, was designed by Robert J. Reiley and was built in 1925–26 at the cost of $40,000. It has a capacity of 250 persons. The building has three floors which house the "Cardinal Sin Memorial Hall", offices and living quarters for the archdiocese coordinator.

History
In 1982, a bronze statue of the first Filipino saint, San Lorenzo Ruiz, was donated by Philippine Cardinal Jaime Sin to Filipinos in the United States. It was brought to the U.S. by Celso Al Carunungan, author of To Die A Thousand Deaths, a book on the life and martyrdom of Ruiz, accompanied by Father Ramon Salinas, the national director of the Movement for the Cause of San Lorenzo Ruiz and Companion Martyrs.  Carunungan and Salinas, together with Filipino youth leaders Antonio Santiago and Paul John Durano Gorre, were delegated by Cardinal Sin to establish a movement for San Lorenzo Ruiz in the United States.

The statue of San Lorenzo Ruiz was displayed every September at Saint Patrick's Cathedral during the mass for the saint's feast day. It was originally displayed at the Holy Family Church at the United Nations until it was transferred to the Philippine Pastoral Center in 1998.

Filipino Apostolate
The Filipino Apostolate was established by Archbishop John Cardinal O'Connor on April 11, 1995, to address the pastoral needs of Filipino Catholics in New York. It is in charge of the Chapel of San Lorenzo Ruiz and the Philippine Pastoral Center. Father Erno Diaz was appointed as the first archdiocesan coordinator and director of the Filipino Apostolate. Rev. Dr. Jose Marabe is the present Director of San Lorenzo Ruiz Chapel.

In 1998, a building was leased to the Filipino Apostolate at 248 East 62nd Street in Manhattan.  The building was officially named as the Philippine Pastoral Center and became a venue for priests and cultural groups in New York, giving lectures, celebrating masses and performing cultural and religious activities.

Chapel
The Chapel of San Lorenzo Ruiz officially opened on September 1, 2005.  The opening was followed by an inaugural mass celebrated by Cardinal O'Connor on September 15, 2005. It is the third Catholic church officially dedicated to Filipinos outside the Philippines. The first one - St. Columban Filipino Catholic Church (1944) - is in Historic Filipinotown in Los Angeles, and the second one - The Basilica of Sta. Pudenciana (1991) - is in Rome.

On September 15, 2005, the bronze statue of San Lorenzo Ruiz was enshrined and unveiled in the chapel. Philippine President Gloria Macapagal Arroyo was the guest of honor. Weekly masses and novenas are held in the chapel to honor the first Filipino saint and martyr.  The statue is considered miraculous by devotees.

Although not an official parish church, Cardinal Egan has authorized the Chapel of San Lorenzo Ruiz to offer weekday and weekend masses and all of the Sacraments of the Church, with the exception of the Sacrament of Confirmation, as only a bishop can confer the Sacrament of Confirmation.  Sunday Masses, Filipino-style weddings, baptisms, and funerals are held in the chapel. Although it has been designated as a church for the Filipino community and was authorized to perform Filipino liturgies, it welcomes all peoples regardless of ethnicity and background to attend its services and to participate in the events held in it and the Philippine Pastoral Center.

The Filipino Apostolate's aim is to elevate the designation of the Chapel of San Lorenzo Ruiz into a parish church status.  Factors that will help the Filipino Apostolate in achieving this goal is by maintaining good record-keeping, financial management and pastoral programs.

20th anniversary
On September 29, 2007, the Roman Catholic Church celebrated the 20th anniversary of Lorenzo Ruiz's canonization in 1987. Manila's Then Archbishop Gaudencio Cardinal Rosales said:

Kahit saan nandoon ang mga Pilipino, ang katapatan sa Diyos ay dala-dala ng Pinoy. ("Wherever Filipinos may go, they carry their faith in God.")

Sale
On July 11, 2017, it was announced that the archdiocese sold the church for $7.3 million.

See also
Filipinos in the New York metropolitan area
Pontificio Collegio Filippino
Philippine Center, New York
Jeronima de la Asuncion
Martha de San Bernardo -First Filipino Nun
Mother Ignacia del Espiritu Santo
Religious of the Virgin Mary
Three Fertility Saints of Obando, Bulacan, Philippines

References 
Notes

External links

Official website

Saint Lorenzo
Roman Catholic churches in Manhattan
Filipino-American culture in New York City
20th-century Roman Catholic church buildings in the United States
Christian organizations established in 1925
Christian organizations established in 1995
Christian organizations established in 2005
Roman Catholic churches completed in 1926
Nolita
Roman Catholic chapels in the United States